The National Collegiate Hockey Conference (NCHC) is an NCAA men's Division I hockey conference formed on July 9, 2011. The league began playing for the 2013–14 season, the same season that the Big Ten Conference began competition, as a combination of six previous members of the WCHA and two of the CCHA. The league is headquartered in Colorado Springs, Colorado.

History

The men's college ice hockey landscape was shaken on March 21, 2011, when the Big Ten Conference was announced it would sponsor the sport following Penn State having fielding a  team, bringing the number of Big Ten members with teams to six. The WCHA faced the loss of the Minnesota Golden Gophers and Wisconsin Badgers in the future, whereas the CCHA faced the loss of the Michigan Wolverines, the Michigan State Spartans, and Ohio State Buckeyes. Some of the remaining teams of the WCHA and CCHA began talks to form a league that would ensure their survival as financially strong and successful programs.

On July 9, 2011, the athletic directors of the six founding schools, Colorado College, the University of Denver, Miami University, the University of Minnesota Duluth, the University of Nebraska Omaha, and the University of North Dakota, confirmed these reports by announcing the conference officially and giving the date for a press conference for further information on July 13, 2011.

At the July 13, 2011 press conference, Brian Faison, athletic director of the University of North Dakota, and one of the main speakers said that the motivation for this conference was to put teams together that "have displayed a high level of competitiveness on the ice, [have] an institutional commitment to compete at the highest level within Division I, provide a national platform for exposure, and have wonderful history and tradition within their institution and hockey programs."

On September 22, 2011, St. Cloud State University and Western Michigan University accepted invitations to join the NCHC.

On March 7, 2013, the NCHC unveiled the logo for the inaugural season. It features a shield design with the colors red, white, and blue.  Inside the shield are eight stars, presumably representing the eight inaugural members, and a hockey stick on the bottom left.

On May 12, 2022, Heather Weems was named third commissioner of the NCHC.

Members

Champions

(*) = Both the 2020 NCHC and NCAA Tournaments were cancelled due to the COVID-19 pandemic.

The Penrose Cup is a trophy that has been awarded to the NCHC's regular-season champion since the conference's beginning in 2013. The award is named in honor of Julie and Spencer Penrose who created the El Pomar Foundation that played a major role in the establishment of the NCHC.

NCHC Tournament champions

Conference arenas

Membership timeline

Awards
At the conclusion of each regular season schedule the coaches of each NCHC team vote which players they choose to be on the three All-Conference Teams: first team, second team and rookie team. Additionally they vote to award the 10 individual trophies to an eligible player at the same time. The CCHA also awards Most Valuable Player in Tournament which is voted on at the conclusion of the conference tournament. All of the awards were created for the inaugural season (2013–14).

All-Conference Teams

Individual Awards

the award was known as the 'Defenseman of the Year Award' prior to 2017

See also

Western Collegiate Hockey Association
Central Collegiate Hockey Association
Big Ten Conference
Battle for the Gold Pan, a famous rivalry between Colorado's two NCHC schools

References

External links
NCHC Hockey Homepage

 
Ice hockey leagues in the United States
Organizations established in 2011
Organizations based in Colorado Springs, Colorado
College ice hockey conferences in the United States
2011 establishments in the United States
Articles which contain graphical timelines